Odbojkarski klub Kamnik, known as Calcit Volley due to sponsorship reasons, is a Slovenian volleyball team from Kamnik. The club was founded in 1947 and competes in the Slovenian League and in MEVZA League. Calcit Volley won the Slovenian League three times, consecutively between 2000–01 and 2002–03.

Honours

Slovenian Volleyball League
 Winners (3): 2000–01, 2001–02, 2002–03
Slovenian Volleyball Cup
 Winners (4): 2000–01, 2015–16, 2016–17, 2020–21

References

External links
Official website 

Slovenian volleyball clubs
Volleyball clubs established in 1947
1947 establishments in Slovenia
Kamnik